Mangana was one of the quarters of Byzantine-era Constantinople. Located on the easternmost edge of the Sirkeci peninsula in which the city is located, it housed an imperial palace, arsenal and several churches and charitable establishments throughout the middle and late Byzantine periods.

History
The quarter was located on the extreme east of the peninsula, directly above the Great Palace and between the ancient acropolis of Byzantium and the Bosporus strait, and took its name from a large arsenal for military engines (mangana). The site was closely connected to the nearby Great Palace, and several emperors constructed buildings there. Emperor Michael I Rhangabe (r. 811–813) owned a mansion there which was converted into a crown domain by Emperor Basil I (r. 867–886) and administered by a kourator. The position of [megas] kourator also involved the supervision of imperial estates in the provinces, whose proceeds went to the upkeep of the imperial court, as well as to supplying military expeditions.

Emperor Constantine IX Monomachos (r. 1042–1055) built a monastery dedicated to Saint George (with cloister and surrounding garden), as well as a hospital, a palace, old-age homes, hostels, poor-houses, and a law school. During his reign, Constantine IX granted the "pronoia of Mangana" to Constantine (III) Leichoudes who would later become Patriarch of Constantinople. The term pronoia would usually mean that Leichoudes enjoyed the proceeds of the Mangana, but in this case its meaning is debatable. During the 14th century, Emperor John VI Kantakouzenos (r. 1347–1354) lived at Mangana as a monk for a period of time after his abdication in 1354.

Monastery of Saint George
Constantine IX died after contracting pleurisy while bathing in the pond at the monastery of Saint George in January 1055. He was ultimately buried at the monastery. Years later, the palace that Emperor Monomachos built at Mangana was destroyed by Emperor Isaac II Angelos (r. 1185–1195 and 1203–1204), but the monastery complex of Saint George survived until the fall of Constantinople in May 1453. Since its construction, the Byzantine imperial court made annual visits to the monastery on April 23, which was the feast day of Saint George. This tradition was interrupted during the Fourth Crusade of the 13th century when Latin monks briefly occupied the monastery until it was restored to the Byzantine Greeks by Emperor Michael VIII Palaiologos (r. 1259–1261). During the Byzantine civil war of 1341–1347, the Byzantine theologian and statesman Demetrios Kydones retired to an apartment at the monastery of Saint George after having obtained an adelphaton (or the right, granted on payment of a sum of money, to live in a monastery without becoming a monk). The monastery was particularly famous during the 14th century when it contained relics of the Passion of Christ and became a place of pilgrimage for Orthodox faithful from as far away as Russia. After the Fall of Constantinople in 1453, the monastery complex was occupied for a short time by dervishes, before being demolished by the Ottomans to make way for the construction of the Topkapi Palace.

References

Sources

Quarters and suburbs of Constantinople